Alcorta is a surname of Basque origin. Notable people with the surname include:

Amancio Alcorta (1842–1902), Argentine legal theorist, politician and diplomat
Amancio Jacinto Alcorta (1805–1862), Argentine composer, policy maker and politician
Casimiro Alcorta (1840–1913), Argentine musician
Gloria Alcorta (1918-2012), Argentine writer, poet and sculptor
Ignacio Alcorta (born 1937), Spanish rower
José Figueroa Alcorta (1860–1931), Argentine politician
Lourdes Alcorta (born 1951), Peruvian author, social communicator and politician

References

Basque-language surnames